Phi Beta Pi medical fraternity is a professional fraternity founded in 1891 at the West Pennsylvania Medical College.

History 
Phi Beta Pi medical fraternity is a professional fraternity founded March 10, 1891, at the West Pennsylvania Medical College, a school that is now a department of the University of Pittsburgh). It was, at its beginning, an anti-fraternity society, reactionary to the more secret groups of the day. At formation it was known briefly as Pi Beta Phi professional fraternity, but changed its name because a woman's fraternity also known as Pi Beta Phi  had prior claim to that name.

Its Beta chapter was established at the University of Michigan on April 1, 1898, with its first national general assembly in Ann Arbor on January 6, 1900.

Baird's Manual (20th ed.) reports that Phi Beta Pi absorbed an early, secret medical fraternity named Kappa Lambda, which may have been the first professional fraternity of any account.  It had been founded in 1803 at Transylvania University, in Lexington, Kentucky, extending chapters to the College of Physicians and Surgeons of New York, to Rutgers University Medical School (NJ), the Jefferson Medical College in Philadelphia, and elsewhere. It continued to be active in New York until the eve of the Civil War, to 1858 or later, "but having no useful purpose faded into oblivion."  Baird's reports that what remained of Kappa Lambda consolidated with Phi Beta Pi under that name, even though Phi Beta Pi dates to 1891.

Over three decades the fraternity chartered 53 chapters. Growth slowed, adding ten more by 1955.

Growth was difficult, with probably the single biggest negative factor cited as being the consolidation and discontinuance of medical schools.  In 1906 there were 162 medical schools in the United States and Canada, but by 1954 there were 79. Additionally, medical societies were in competition among themselves. Phi Beta Pi for a time gained from others' loss: In 1934 Omega Upsilon Phi medical fraternity, founded at Buffalo in 1894, merged into Phi Beta Pi, bringing with it an additional 24 chapter designations, some of which merged into existing Phi Beta Pi chapters, some closed, and with its Alpha chapter at the University of Buffalo leaving to join rival Phi Chi Medical Fraternity as its Omega Upsilon Phi chapter.

Later, in what was considered a merger of equals, Phi Beta Pi consolidated operations with Theta Kappa Psi, both contributing their remaining chapters to the combined group in 1961, and retaining the names of both national fraternities. Some chapters, notably those in Texas and Manitoba, fought against this merger which at first would have required Theta Kappa Psi to give up its name. These groups began to organize a schismatic and similarly named international group, but this effort failed to launch.

Thirty years later, in the Spring of 1992, Phi Beta Pi-Theta Kappa Psi was dissolved. At the time of dissolution there were only nine active chapters in existence. The only remaining chapter of Phi Beta Pi is situated at The University of Texas Medical Branch in Galveston, Texas. It has expressed an interest in rebuilding the national with additional chapters.

Traditions and insignia 
Its badge is a diamond of gold with emerald points and pearl edges. A black enamel center with gold skull and pelvis and the letters "ΦΒΠ."

Chapters
Below is a list of Phi Beta Pi chapters.

Omega Upsilon Phi fraternity merged into Phi Beta Pi 1934. All active chapters became active chapters of Phi Beta Pi except Alpha which joined Phi Chi Medical Fraternity.

Theta Kappa Psi fraternity merged in 1961.

Other professional medical fraternities
In addition to the medical fraternities listed here, there are numerous chiropractic, pre-health, pharmacy and nursing fraternities.
 Alpha Delta Theta, medical technology
 Alpha Gamma Kappa
 Alpha Kappa Kappa
 Alpha Phi Sigma, see Phi Delta Epsilon 
 Alpha Tau Sigma, Osteopathic, dormant
 Mu Sigma Phi, Philippines
 Nu Sigma Nu
 Omega Tau Sigma, veterinary medicine
 Omega Upsilon Phi, see Phi Beta Pi
 Phi Alpha Gamma, formerly Homeopathic, see Phi Chi
 Phi Chi
 Phi Delta Epsilon
 Phi Kappa Mu, Philippines
 Phi Lambda Kappa
 Phi Rho Sigma
 Sigma Mu Delta, pre-medical
 Theta Kappa Psi

References

 
1891 establishments in Pennsylvania
Student organizations established in 1891
Medical associations based in the United States
Professional medical fraternities and sororities in the United States
Former members of Professional Fraternity Association